Alfred "Fredy" Müller (8 June 1905 – 17 March 1959) was a German middle-distance runner. In 1928, he won a silver medal in 800 m at the 1928 Summer Student World Championships. He competed in this event at the 1928 Summer Olympics, but failed to reach the final.

References

1905 births
1959 deaths
German male middle-distance runners
Athletes (track and field) at the 1928 Summer Olympics
Olympic athletes of Germany
Sportspeople from Warmian-Masurian Voivodeship
People from Ełk
People from East Prussia